Ronald is an unincorporated community in Beaver Township, Aitkin County, Minnesota, United States. The community is located along State Highway 27 (MN 27) near 100th Place. Nearby places include Kettle River, Lawler, Arthyde, and Moose Lake.

The boundary line between Aitkin and Carlton counties is nearby. ZIP codes 55760 (McGregor) and 55783 (Sturgeon Lake) meet near Ronald.

History
The community had a post office from 1894 to 1926.

References

Unincorporated communities in Aitkin County, Minnesota
Unincorporated communities in Minnesota